Star Command is a video game released by Strategic Simulations in 1988.

Plot
The player creates a crew of eight characters.  The crew completes missions from Star Command to earn credits and train personnel. The crew can explore planets to obtain valuable elements, and can board intact enemy ships to fight their foes man-to-man and commandeer the enemy ship.

Reception

The game was reviewed in 1988 in Dragon #138 by Hartley, Patricia, and Kirk Lesser in "The Role of Computers" column. The reviewers gave the game 4 1/2 out of 5 stars. Jim Trunzo reviewed Star Command for White Wolf #14, rating it 5 overall, and stated that "This review has only touched upon the major facets of "Star Command". Many other subtleties make this product an enjoyable and challenging simulation. The graphics are well-done and functional and the mechanics of play are simple in spite of the game's sophistication."

Orson Scott Card was less favorable, writing in Compute! that Star Command "wants to be Starflight or Sentinel Worlds, but it isn't". He said that the "primitive graphics" were adequate, but "the problem is that there's no sense of experiencing anything. Mostly you're told about what's going on, and after a short time it seemed to me that it was a text game which consisted of" mechanical fetch quests. In a 1992 survey of science fiction games, Computer Gaming World gave the title two-plus stars of five, and a 1994 survey of strategic space games set in the year 2000 and later gave the game two stars.

Reviews
Shadis #1 (Jan., 1990)
Commodore User - Nov, 1989
ASM (Aktueller Software Markt) - Dec, 1989

References

External links

Review in Family Computing

1988 video games
Amiga games
Atari ST games
DOS games
Role-playing video games
Science fiction video games
Strategic Simulations games
Video games developed in the United States
Video games set in outer space